The Stanley Theater at Kennedy Boulevard and Pavonia Avenue is near Journal Square in Jersey City, New Jersey.

The theater opened to the public on March 24, 1928. Mayor Frank Hague attended the ceremonies that evening and, with the audience, was greeted on the screen by actress Norma Talmadge. An orchestral performance, a stage show called "Sky Blues," a newsreel, and a musical piece on the Wurlitzer organ preceded the showing of The Dove starring Talmadge and Gilbert Roland.

The Stanley was designed by architect Fred Wesley Wentworth (1864-1943), who is noted for designing many buildings in Paterson following the 1902 fire.  When it opened, its 4,300 seats earned it the rank of the second largest theater on the East Coast, behind only New York City's Radio City Music Hall. It was fourth in the country in number of seats in a one-screen theater, behind Radio City, and the Detroit and St. Louis Fox theaters. It was an elegant and popular venue into the 1960s. Stage shows at the theater reflected the popular culture of the times with entertainers ranging from The Three Stooges and Jimmy Durante to Tony Bennett, Janis Joplin, Dolly Parton, and the Grateful Dead. During the 1970s, however, movie attendance suffered and the theater fell into disrepair, and became an RKO (Radio-Keith-Orpheum Pictures) grindhouse. The once beautiful metalwork throughout the building was painted dark blue, and the Wurlitzer organ was removed in the 1970s. It finally closed as a movie theater April 20, 1978.

In 1983, the building was purchased by the Watch Tower Society for use as a convention and assembly hall for Jehovah's Witnesses. Thousands of Witness volunteers worked over a nine-month period to renovate the theater. Beginning in October 2012, the theater underwent further renovation by over 2,000 Witness volunteers from across the United States.

Description 
A glittering copper marquee spans the entrance, overhanging the solid brass doors. Three large arched windows sit over the marquee. Building materials include marble from Italy, Vermont and Texas, limestone from Indiana, and granite from Maine to face the Corinthian columns.

The interior has a three-story lobby adorned with columns, a broad center staircase with trompe l'oeil alabaster handrails and balusters, lamps, velvet drapes, and stained glass windows of faux "Chartre Blue" in the foyer. Allegorical paintings by Hungarian muralist Willy Pogany originally adorned the ceiling and walls.

The larger of two crystal chandeliers, suspended from the second floor, is from the New York's original Waldorf Astoria of the 1880s; it is thirteen feet tall and ten feet wide, and illuminated by 144 bulbs that reflect onto 4,500 hanging crystal teardrops.

The grand staircase is the main feature of the three-story lobby. During the day, sunlight streams in, illuminating the lobby. An immense crystal chandelier shines after the sun sets. On three sides of the lobby, stands a formation of marble columns topped by a balcony. A nearly celestial ceiling actually had machine generated clouds and points of light that twinkled like stars.

Movie palace architect John Eberson contributed the design for the auditorium. Here theatergoers enter the environment of an evening in Venice with a replica of the Rialto Bridge spanning the stage. Above the seating is an eighty-five foot ceiling that permits an open sky effect with stars and moving clouds originally effected by a projecting device called a "Brenkert Brenograph," costing $290 (in 1920s dollars). Lighted stained glass windows line the walls with grottoes, arches and columns simulating the courtyard motif.

On September 26, 27, and 28, 1972, the Grateful Dead played three concerts at the Stanley Theater which are highly regarded among fans.  A recording of the middle show from September 27 was officially released in 1998 as Dick's Picks Volume 11.

See also
Stanley Theater (Newark, New Jersey) (Newark)
Loew's Jersey Theatre (Jersey City)
Park Performing Arts Center (Union City)

External links 
 Carmela Karnoutsos: Stanley Theater, www.njcu.edu

References 

Cinemas and movie theaters in New Jersey
Theatres in New Jersey
Former cinemas in the United States
Buildings and structures in Jersey City, New Jersey
Religious buildings and structures in Hudson County, New Jersey
Tourist attractions in Jersey City, New Jersey
Fred Wesley Wentworth buildings